Feast of Wire is the fourth studio album by American indie rock band Calexico. The album was released on June 18, 2003, through Quarterstick Records.  The album was included in the book 1001 Albums You Must Hear Before You Die.

Reception

Joe Tangari of Pitchfork called Feast of Wire Calexico's "first genuinely masterful full-length, crammed with immediate songcraft, shifting moods and open-ended exploration," and "the album we always knew they had in them but feared they would never make."

Track listing

Personnel 
Credits adapted from CD Universe.
Calexico
Joey Burns – guitar, upright bass, accordion, percussion, cuatro, cello, orchestra bells, pump organ, mandolin, bowed banjo, vibes, synthesizer, melodica, vocals
John Convertino – drums, percussion, piano (track 9)
Paul Niehaus – pedal steel
Jacob Valenzuela – trumpet (tracks 2, 7, 10, 11, 15)
Martin Wenk – accordion (tracks 4, 7), trumpet (tracks 7, 11), bowed vibes (track 16)
Volker Zander – upright bass (tracks 4, 16)

Additional personnel
Ed Kay – flute (track 15)
Eddie Lopez – button accordion (track 11)
Nick Luca – synthesizer (tracks 2, 5, 10), piano (tracks 4, 15), vibes (track 10), electric guitar (track 15)
Jeff "Fruitpie" Marchant – trombone (track 15)
Craig Schumacher – synthesizer (tracks 2, 16), tympani (track 7), backup vocals (tracks 1, 2), trumpet (track 2)
Fernando Valencia – violin (track 11)
Joseph Valenzuela – trombone (track 2)

Charts

References

External links
 

2003 albums
Calexico (band) albums
Quarterstick Records albums